Plectorrhiza tridentata, commonly known as the common tangle orchid, is an epiphytic or lithophytic orchid that has many coarse, tangled roots, up to twenty egg-shaped leaves and up to fifteen green or brown, star-shaped flowers with a white labellum. It grows on rainforest trees and in other humid places and occurs between the Daintree National Park in Queensland and the far north-eastern corner of Victoria.

Description
The sepals and petals are free from each other and spread widely apart. Flowering occurs from September to January.

Taxonomy and naming
The common tangle orchid was first formally described in 1838 by John Lindley who gave it the name Cleisostoma tridentatum and published the description in Edwards's Botanical Register. In 1967 Alick Dockrill changed the name to Plectorrhiza tridentata. The specific epithet (tridentata) is derived from the Latin word tridens meaning "a fork with three tines".

Distribution and habitat
Plectorrhiza tridentata usually grows on trees in humid places such as deep gullies and swamps. It is found in from the Daintree area in Queensland south along the coast and nearby ranges of New South Wales to rainforest east of the Snowy River in north-eastern Victoria.

References

Aeridinae
Epiphytic orchids
Endemic orchids of Australia
Orchids of New South Wales
Orchids of Queensland
Orchids of Victoria (Australia)
Plants described in 1838